David Cauldron is an icefall of turbulent iceblocks on the David Glacier, in Victoria Land. It was named by the Southern Party of the New Zealand Geological Survey Antarctic Expedition, 1962–63, in association with David Glacier.

References
 

Icefalls of Antarctica
Landforms of Victoria Land
Scott Coast